Isidore Noël Belleau (March 7, 1847 in Deschambault, Canada West – May 7, 1936) was a Canadian politician, director, editor and lawyer. He was elected to the House of Commons of Canada in an 1883 by-election to represent the riding of Lévis. He was also defeated in the elections of 1874 for Portneuf and 1887 for Bellechasse. He was elected as mayor of Lévis, Quebec between 1891 and 1895. His son-in-law, Émile Fortin, was a senator and Member of Parliament.

External links 
 City of Montreal Portraits
 Mortuary card of Isidore-Noël Belleau
 

1847 births
1936 deaths
Conservative Party of Canada (1867–1942) MPs
Members of the House of Commons of Canada from Quebec
Université Laval alumni